Oskar Blümm (26 June 1884 – 12 December 1951) was a general in the Wehrmacht of Nazi Germany during World War II who commanded the 57th Infantry Division. He was a recipient of the Knight's Cross of the Iron Cross.

Awards and decorations

 Knight's Cross of the Iron Cross on 23 November 1941 as Generalleutnant and commander of 57. Infanterie-Division

References

Citations

Bibliography

1884 births
1951 deaths
20th-century Freikorps personnel
German Army personnel of World War I
German prisoners of war in World War II
Lieutenant generals of the German Army (Wehrmacht)
Military personnel of Bavaria
People from the Kingdom of Bavaria
People from Regen (district)
Recipients of the clasp to the Iron Cross, 1st class
Recipients of the Knight's Cross of the Iron Cross
Reichswehr personnel